Frantz Jourdain (3 October 1847 – 22 August 1935) was a Belgian architect and author. He is best known for La Samaritaine, an Art Nouveau department store built in the  1st arrondissement of Paris in three stages between 1904 and 1928. He was respected as an authority on Art Nouveau.

Life

Frantz Jourdain was born in 1847.
In the 1860s he studied in Paris at the École des Beaux-Arts.
He obtained French citizenship in 1870.

Critic
Jourdain was a theoretician of Art Nouveau.
He began writing on the arts in 1875, and by the end of his life had published about two hundred articles in sixty magazines and newspapers, at first news items but later critical articles in which he expressed his thoughts on art. Some of these were gathered into collections in 1886 and 1931.
His writings were eclectic. Apart from writing on artistic questions he published a picaresque romance, two collections of short stories, a novel, a play and two collections of portraits of artists.

Between 1880 and 1910 Jourdain was at the forefront of the movement to renew and synthesize the arts, and played an important role in introducing new ideas.
He discovered unknown painters of the late 19th century and was a great admirer of the Galerie des machines of the Exposition Universelle (1889), designed by Ferdinand Dutert and Victor Contamin.
In 1887 he was admitted to the Société des gens de lettres.
He had become a prominent and often quoted art critic by the 1890s, an opponent of academic training and of the English Arts and Crafts movement.
He was hostile to institutions such as the Beaux-Arts, which stifled new talent, and thought the Prix de Rome which sent artists to the Villa Medici to study the well-known antiquities was a waste of time.

Architect

La Samaritaine, a department store, was founded by Ernest Cognacq in 1870 when he leased a small part of a building for commercial use. He then bought the building, and in stages bought the building that faces it on the rue de la Monnaie. In 1885 he engaged Jourdain to redesign the original building, and at the same time began to improve the exterior of the building. In 1904 Cognacq decided to expand the store. Jourdain was given the job of creating the maximum amount of space as quickly and cheaply as possible, and designed a radical steel structure. The flamboyant exterior decoration was executed by his son, the decorator Francis Jourdain, the painter Eugène Grasset, the metalworker Edouard Schenck and the ceramist Alexandre Bigot.
His use of glass and an exposed steel frame in this design was both radical and functional, although soon after completion it drew criticism from a new generation of architects that rejected Art Nouveau.

His work was part of the architecture event in the art competitions at the 1912 Summer Olympics.

La Semeuse de Paris was built between 1910 and 1912 to house the credit department of La Samaritaine department stores for lending to the poorest customers. The art nouveau building also contained apartments. It was listed as a historical monument on 11 December 2000.
In 1925 Cognacq was authorized to construct a second building. Jourdain and Henri Sauvage began work in January 1926, and completed it in September 1928 after many changes from the original plan. At the request of the prefecture the steel frame was given a cream-colored stone exterior. Jourdain built Store 3 on the lot bounded by the rues de Rivoli, Pont-Neuf and Boucher between 1930 and 1933. The interior is best preserved in Store 2, with a glass roof, wide staircases and characteristic bright blue, green and orange colors.

Later years
From 1903 Jourdain was president of the Salon d'Automne. He was a founding member of the Société du Nouveau Paris, a group that promoted modernization of Paris.
Frantz Jourdain died in 1935. His son Francis Jourdain (1876-1958) was a designer, writer and painter.
Francis Jourdain said of the society in which he grew up that it was dominated by people who were highly opinionated and quick to take sides. Although its members pretended to be in favor of liberty and compassion, he saw it as tainted by prejudices, xenophobia and extreme emotion. His father was very much typical of this society.

Buildings

1876 Restoration of the castle of La Roche-Guyon, Val-d'Oise
1878 Chapel of the Dida family in Draveil, Essonne
 Villa in Chelles, Seine-et-Marne
1887 Seven-story tenement, 9 rue Galilée – rue Hamelin, 16th arrondissement of Paris, with Henri Fivaz
1888 Factory in Pantin, Seine-Saint-Denis
1893 Restoration of the Château de Verteuil, Charente
1893 Imprimerie Nouvelle, 9–11 rue Cadet, 9th arrondissement of Paris
1894 Town house of the iron dealer Schenck, 9 rue Vergniaud, 13th arrondissement of Paris
1898 Grave of Alphonse Daudet in Père Lachaise Cemetery, Paris, in collaboration with the sculptor Alexandre Falguière
1899 Expansion of the department store La Samaritaine to two floors, 75 rue de Rivoli, 1st arrondissement of Paris
1902 Grave of Émile Zola in Montmartre Cemetery, Paris
1905–07 Reconstruction of La Samaritaine, rue Baillet – rue de l'Arbre Sec – rue de la Monnaie, 1st arrondissement of Paris
1910–12 La Semeuse de Paris, 16 rue du Louvre, 1st arrondissement of Paris
1914–17 Department store La Samaritaine de Luxe, 27 boulevard des Capucines, 2nd arrondissement of Paris
1926–28 Extension (Magasin 2) of La Samaritaine, rue du Pont Neuf – quai du Louvre, 1st arrondissement of Paris, in collaboration with Henri Sauvage
1930–33 Extension (Magasin 3) of La Samaritaine, rue de Rivoli – rue du Pont-Neuf – rue Boucher, 1st arrondissement of Paris
Date unknown. Restoration of the castle Châteauneuf-sur-Sarthe, Maine-et-Loire

Selected publications

References

Sources

1847 births
Architects from Antwerp
1935 deaths
Collège Stanislas de Paris alumni
19th-century French architects
20th-century French architects
French art critics
Art Nouveau architects
Olympic competitors in art competitions